The 5th Goya Awards were presented in Madrid, Spain on 16 February 1991.

¡Ay, Carmela! won the award for Best Film.

Winners and nominees

Major award nominees

Other award nominees

Honorary Goya
 Enrique Alarcón

External links
Official website (Spanish)
IMDb profile

05
1990 film awards
1990 in Spanish cinema